WARW is a Christian worship formatted radio station, licensed to Port Chester, New York and is the Air 1 radio affiliate for Westchester County, New York and the Connecticut Panhandle. The station is currently owned by Educational Media Foundation and its transmitter is located in New Rochelle, New York.

History
WARW went on the air in 1947 as WSTC-FM licensed to Stamford, Connecticut and simulcasting WSTC. On February 19, 1974, the call letters were changed to WYRS and the station began programming an automated beautiful music format aimed at women using the moniker "Yours 96.7". At 6:00 p.m. on September 2, 1980 WYRS switched to a jazz format after WRVR in New York City had switched formats from jazz to country music. On December 17, 1981, the station was sold to Radio Stamford Inc. The call letters were changed to WJAZ in 1987. In 1990, the format was changed to an oldies format of songs from 1954 to 1973 and the call letters changed to WQQQ with branding as "Q-96.7".  From 1992 to 2006, the station was known as WKHL, branded as "Kool 96.7", with no change in format. On March 29, 2006, the station changed from oldies to classic hits as 96.7 The Coast under the WCTZ calls. The FCC approved an allocations shift to Port Chester, New York in December 2006 which allowed the station greater access to New York City; at the time, the station still marketed itself strictly to a Fairfield County audience.

On November 5, 2010, Educational Media Foundation announced they would be purchasing WCTZ and moving the transmitter to the Trump Plaza in New Rochelle, serving as the K-LOVE affiliate for New York City with the call letters WKLV-FM; the sale was completed in mid-May 2011, after which the station went silent for a few weeks to relocate its transmitter.

On February 13, 2019, WPLJ New York and five other Cumulus Media stations were sold to the Rocklin, California-based nonprofit broadcaster, Educational Media Foundation (EMF) for $103.5 million. After the sale received final approval by the FCC, EMF announced that WPLJ and the other Cumulus stations acquired would all begin broadcasting its primary programming service, K-Love, on June 1 at midnight local time; this was later moved up to May 31 at 7:00 p.m., five hours earlier than originally planned.

EMF's acquisition of WPLJ created a duopoly for their non-profit enterprise in the New York City market. Between May 31 and July 10, 2019, EMF programmed both WKLV-FM and WPLJ with K-Love programming, but this was not a true simulcast, as a time-delay existed between both stations. On July 11, 2019, the duplicated programming arrangement ceased as EMF swapped the WKLV-FM call-sign with their K-Love affiliate for Butler, Alabama, WMKQ. Simultaneously, EMF discontinued K-Love programming over 96.7 FM and replaced it with a looping message stating that K-Love programming for the New York City market had moved exclusively to WPLJ and that sister network Air 1 would soon be launched on 96.7. On July 19, 2019, Air 1 programming began on the station, which concurrently changed its call letters to WARW (transferred from the Air 1 station in Remsen, New York). On July 26, 2019, WARW moved "K-Love Classics" from 96.7 HD-3 to 96.7 HD-2, and Radio Nueva Vida started broadcasting on the HD3 subchannel.

References

External links

ARW (FM)
Radio stations established in 1947
1947 establishments in New York (state)
Air1 radio stations
Educational Media Foundation radio stations
ARW (FM)